The 1930 Minnesota lieutenant gubernatorial election took place on November 6, 1930. Minnesota Farmer–Labor Party candidate Henry M. Arens defeated Republican Party of Minnesota challenger John H. Hougen.

Results

Lieutenant Gubernatorial
1930

Minnesota